The Washington State Department of Transportation (WSDOT or WashDOT, both ) is a governmental agency that constructs, maintains, and regulates the use of transportation infrastructure in the U.S. state of Washington. Established in 1905, it is led by a secretary and overseen by the governor. WSDOT is responsible for more than 20,000 lane-miles of roadway, nearly 3,000 vehicular bridges and 524 other structures. This infrastructure includes rail lines, state highways, state ferries (considered part of the highway system) and state airports.

History

Department of Highways

WSDOT was founded as the Washington State Highway Board and the Washington State Highways Department on March 13, 1905, when then-governor Albert Mead signed a bill that allocated $110,000 to fund new roads that linked the state. The State Highway Board was managed by State Treasurer, State Auditor, and Highway Commissioner Joseph M. Snow and the Board first met on April 17, 1905, to plan the 12 original state roads. The first state highway districts, each managed by a District Engineer, were established in 1918. During this period, the construction of highways began.

In 1921, the State Highway Board was replaced by the Washington Highway Committee and the Washington State Highways Department became a division of the Washington State Department of Public Works. The first gas tax (1¢ per gallon) was levied and Homer Hadley started planning a pontoon bridge across Lake Washington, which would later become the Lacey V. Murrow Memorial Bridge, which opened on July 2, 1940. In 1923, the State Highways Department separated from the Public Works Department and organized the first official system of highways, Washington's state road system. In 1926, the U.S. government approved the U.S. route system, which connected the country by road. 11 U.S. Routes entered Washington at the time. Later in 1929, the Highway Committee was merged with the State Highways Department. The Lake Washington Floating Bridge and the original Tacoma Narrows Bridge opened in 1940. The Tacoma Narrows Bridge collapsed because of winds on November 7 that year, earning it the name Galloping Gertie.

The Washington State Highway Commission was formed in 1951. On June 29, 1956, President Dwight Eisenhower signed the Federal Aid Highway Act of 1956, which started the Interstate Highway System. Originally, two Interstates entered Washington; most work was not completed until the 1970s. In 1964, the state highways were renumbered to the current system. Metro Transit was created in 1972 and work on highways rapidly continued. The North Cascades Highway (SR 20) was completed in 1972, and the first HOV lanes in Washington were installed on SR 520 that same year.

Department of Transportation

A combined state department of transportation was proposed in the mid-1960s and gained the support of Governor Dan Evans. Charles Prahl, who resigned as head of the Department of Highways, criticized the Evans administration's proposal to create a transportation "superagency" and the prioritization of rapid transit in plans for the urban transportation system of Seattle. The Washington State Department of Transportation was authorized by the state legislature and assumed the responsibilities of several agencies on September 21, 1977. William A. Bulley, the existing Director of Highways, was appointed as the state's first Secretary of Transportation to lead the new agency, which had absorbed state departments that had overseen highways, toll bridges, aeronautics, canals, and community development. The State Highway Commission was renamed to the Washington State Transportation Commission, with its first meeting taking place on September 21, 1977.

On February 13, 1979, the western pontoons of the Hood Canal Bridge were swept away by a wind storm. In 1980, Mount St. Helens erupted and caused damage to many state highways, mainly SR 504. The Hood Canal Replacement Bridge opened on October 3, 1982, and the Lacey V. Murrow Memorial Bridge collapsed on November 25, 1990.

In 1991, a smaller renumbering of state highways occurred. The renumbering produced some new highways and either realigned or removed highways from the system. In 1996, Sound Transit was formed and in the same year, the Washington State Transportation Commission adopted its first 20-year transportation plan. Throughout the 1990s, WSDOT focused increasingly on rail systems and partnered with Amtrak to create a train route that went from Canada to Oregon, which later became the Amtrak Cascades. The 2001 Nisqually earthquake damaged most state highways around the Seattle metropolitan area and most of the budget was turned over to the Puget Sound region to help rebuild and repair roads and bridges.

Administration

WSDOT divides the state into six regions: the Olympic, Northwest, Southwest, North Central, South Central, and Eastern. The Northwest Region is subdivided into three more regions, which are King County, Snohomish County, and Baker (Whatcom, Skagit, Island, and San Juan counties).

WSDOT is overseen by the Governor of Washington. The governor appoints a Secretary of Transportation who is confirmed by the state legislature. The last Secretary of Transportation was Lynn Peterson, who served until February 5, 2016, when her appointment under Governor Jay Inslee was rejected by the Washington State Senate during the confirmation process. Deputy Secretary of Transportation Roger Millar was appointed as Acting Secretary of Transportation by Governor Inslee on February 10, 2016.

Ferries

WSDOT manages the official ferry service in Washington. WSDOT's ferry service, called Washington State Ferries, is the largest in the United States and third largest in the world. Ferries had been in the Puget Sound since the 1950s. There are 10 routes and 22 ferries currently operating.

Buses

WSDOT began operating the Travel Washington intercity Bus program in 2007. There are currently four lines:
Grape Line, from Pasco to Walla Walla, operated by Airporter Shuttle/Bellair Charters 
Dungeness Line, from Port Angeles to Seattle, operated by Olympic Bus Lines.
Apple Line, from Omak to Ellensburg via Wenatchee, operated by Northwestern Trailways
Gold Line, from Kettle Falls to Spokane, operated by Airporter Shuttle/Bellair Charters

Current projects

As of 2008, there were about 250 projects that were being planned or constructed by WSDOT. Some of the most notable projects that were recently finished include the Tacoma Narrows Bridge project, which built a second bridge adjacent to the original bridge, the SR 167 HOT lanes project, which added HOT lanes over SR 167's existing HOV lanes from the SR 18 area to 180th Street, and the I-5 HOV extensions project, which extended the HOV lanes in Everett from the I-5/SR 99/SR 526/SR 527 interchange to the I-5/US 2/SR 529 Spur interchange.

Some of the main projects in the future include the Alaskan Way Viaduct replacement tunnel, the replacement of the SR 520 Evergreen Point floating bridge, the ferry terminals, the I-5 Crash barrier project and SR 704.

See also

United States Department of Transportation
State highways in Washington

References

Further reading

External links

WSDOT Key Facts

Transportation
Department of Transportation
State departments of transportation of the United States
Government agencies established in 1964
1964 establishments in Washington (state)